Kunki may refer to

Places
Kunki, Lublin Voivodeship (east Poland)
Kunki, Gostynin County in Masovian Voivodeship (east-central Poland)
Kunki, Mława County in Masovian Voivodeship (east-central Poland)
Kunki, Warmian-Masurian Voivodeship (north Poland)
Kunki, Republic of Dagestan (Russia)

See also
Koonki, a trained elephant used to capture wild ones in Assam